The Yahatinda Formation is a geologic formation of Middle Devonian (Givetian) age in the southwestern part of the Western Canada Sedimentary Basin in the mountains of southwestern Alberta. Its type locality lies the on the eastern face of Wapiti Mountain above Ya-Ha-Tinda Ranch at the eastern edge of Banff National Park. The Yahatinda contains a variety of Devonian fossils.

Lithology 
The Yahatinda Formation includes both terrestrial river channel and littoral marine sediments. The channel deposits, which are well exposed at the type locality, consist of reddish, medium- to coarse-grained, cross-bedded dolomitic sandstones, siltstones, conglomerates and breccias. The channels contain eroded cobbles and boulders from the older underlying formations, as well as the remains of land plants and freshwater fish.

The littoral deposits consist of micritic mudstones and dolomitic mudstones that are thought to have been deposited in intertidal to supratidal environments. These sequences include paleosols, calcrete and dolocrete.

Thickness and distribution 
The Yahatinda Formation is present as discontinuous outcrops in the front ranges of the Canadian Rockies in Alberta, from the Brazeau River in the north to near the Kananaskis Lakes in the south, and possibly at Mount Wilson in extreme southern Alberta.

The thickness of the Yahatinda is highly variable because it was deposited on an erosion surface with high topographic relief.

Relationship to other units 
The strata of the Yahatinda Formation were originally included in the Ghost River Formation, but that formation name was later abandoned. The Yahatinda rests unconformably on formations that range in age from late Cambrian to early Ordovician. It is overlain by the Flume and Cairn Formations of the Fairholme Group. It was deposited along the east side of the Western Alberta Ridge, a paleogeographic feature that existed at that time, and it is equivalent to the Cedared Formation that was deposited on the western side of the ridge. It is equivalent in age to the upper part of the Elk Point Group in the basin to the east.

Paleontology 
Plant fossils and remains of freshwater fish are found in the channel sediments of the Yahatinda. Remains attributed to the freshwater fish Coccosteus and other fish fragments have been also been reported.

See also 
 List of fossiliferous stratigraphic units in Alberta

References

External links 
 

Geologic formations of Alberta
Devonian System of North America
Devonian Alberta
Givetian Stage
Sandstone formations
Siltstone formations
Mudstone formations
Conglomerate formations
Fluvial deposits
Tidal deposits
Western Canadian Sedimentary Basin
Devonian southern paleotropical deposits
Fossiliferous stratigraphic units of North America
Paleontology in Alberta